Serafim Grammatikopoulos (born 8 July 1960) is a Greek weightlifter. He competed in the men's super heavyweight event at the 1984 Summer Olympics.

References

1960 births
Living people
Greek male weightlifters
Olympic weightlifters of Greece
Weightlifters at the 1984 Summer Olympics
Place of birth missing (living people)
20th-century Greek people